Graham Plant (born 15 December 1949) is an English former motorcycle speedway rider. He won the Second Division Riders Championship in 1968 and went to a career in the British League with Leicester Lions, Newport Wasps, and Halifax Dukes.

Biography
Born in Leicester, Graham Plant is the son of former speedway rider Wilf Plant, and began racing in his teens, initially in go-kart and sidecar racing. After practicing at King's Lynn, he had his first speedway races in second half events at Long Eaton Speedway in 1967. In 1968 he joined second division Middlesbrough Teessiders on loan from Leicester Lions, and impressive performances (he averaged 8.54 over the season) also led to appearances for first division Lions. He also won the Second Division Riders Championship that year. In 1969 he rode full-time for the Lions, averaging 6.21 over the season, including one full maximum score. Also in 1969, he won the
British Under 21 Championship. By 1971 he was one of the Lions' top riders, averaging 8.78 over the season, and he represented England in international competition and finished third in the Rhodesian Open Championship. In 1972 he moved to Newport Wasps, where he stayed for two seasons before moving on to Halifax Dukes, where he stayed until 1979, although he made no appearances in 1978 and only rode in only a handful of matches in 1979, before retiring. He returned in 1980 with National League team the Milton Keynes Knights where he raced in 1980 and 1981, when his season was cut short after a loss of form and a falling-out with the team management. He returned briefly for the Knights in 1983, before retiring for the final time.

References

1949 births
Living people
Sportspeople from Leicester
British speedway riders
Leicester Lions riders
Middlesbrough Bears riders
Newport Wasps riders
Halifax Dukes riders